Christoffer Kloo (born 1 March 1973) is a retired Finnish football defender.

References 

1973 births
Living people
Finnish footballers
Östers IF players
Vasa IFK players
Association football defenders
Finnish expatriate footballers
Expatriate footballers in Sweden
Finnish expatriate sportspeople in Sweden
Allsvenskan players